Lidhora Khurd is a town in Damoh district of Madhya Pradesh, India.Khurd and Kalan Persian language word which means small and Big respectively when two villages have same name then it is distinguished as Kalan means Big and Khurd means Small with Village Name.

Damoh
Cities and towns in Damoh district